Chad Villella (born February 12, 1977) is an American producer, writer, director and actor. He is co-creator of Chad, Matt & Rob and Radio Silence. His films include Scream, Ready or Not, V/H/S, Devil's Due and Southbound.

Biography
Villella is originally from Punxsutawney, Pennsylvania and a graduate of Mercyhurst College. He is co-creator of the Center for Information Research Analysis And Training (CIRAT).

Film
Villella is co-founder of the filmmaking collectives Chad, Matt & Rob and Radio Silence.

Chad, Matt & Rob
Chad Villella co-founded Chad, Matt & Rob with Matt Bettinelli-Olpin and Rob Polonsky in 2007. The group is known for their unique blend of comedy, adventure, sci-fi and horror. According to an interview in IndieWire, Bettinelli-Olpin worked in the mailroom and later as the office manager at New Line Cinema, where the group would sneak in after hours to use the offices as their sets. Among their numerous short films is the viral found footage style video Roommate Alien Prank Gone Bad and five installments of their first-of-its-kind series of Interactive Adventures. As of November 2013, their shorts have received near 70,000,000 views on the Chad, Matt & Rob YouTube channel.

Radio Silence
After the dissolution of Chad, Matt & Rob, Villella formed Radio Silence with Bettinelli-Olpin, Tyler Gillett and Justin Martinez.  The group directed a segment in the feature film V/H/S," which premiered at the 2012 Sundance Film Festival and was acquired by Magnolia Pictures. Their segment of V/H/S is titled 10/31/98 and according to Ain't It Cool News the story is "set on Halloween as a group of friends go in search for a Halloween party."

The following year, they made Devil's Due for 20th Century Fox and their film Southbound premiered at the 2015  Toronto International Film Festival and was released theatrically by the Orchard on February 5, 2016.

On October 30, 2017, it was announced that the trio would adapt Bryce Moore's novel The Memory Thief for 20th Century Fox.

In March 2020, it was announced that Villella would executive produce the fifth installment of the Scream franchise, alongside Kevin Williamson with Bettinelli-Olpin and Gillett co-directing. The film will be released on January 14, 2022.

Filmography

External links

 Radio Silence
Chad, Matt & Rob

References 

1977 births
Male actors from Pennsylvania
American male comedians
21st-century American comedians
American male film actors
Living people
American male writers
American film directors